The 1974–75 CHL season was the 12th season of the Central Hockey League, a North American minor professional league. Eight teams participated in the regular season, and the Salt Lake Golden Eagles won the league title.

Regular season

Playoffs

External links
 Statistics on hockeydb.com

CPHL
Central Professional Hockey League seasons